Arthur Schoos (born 29 August 1936) is a Luxembourgian former football manager. He managed the Luxembourg national football team for two games in 1978. With Marcel Welter he co-managed Young Boys Diekirch in the 1981–1982 season.

References

1936 births
Living people
Luxembourgian football managers
Luxembourg national football team managers